Formula Abarth was an open wheel racing series based in Italy and Europe aimed at karting graduates. The inaugural season was in 2010, effectively replacing the Formula Azzurra.

Abarth have taken over the supporting Project Youth initiative, that started in 2005.' 

After the success of 2010 season, in which competed international drivers and teams, a new European series has been created with a prize offered in collaboration with Ferrari Driver Academy.

In 2014, the Formula Abarth was replaced by the Italian Formula 4 Championship.

Championships

Formula Abarth rewards titles with different classifications according to the following championships:

† The series promoter reserves the right to evaluate single applications

Race weekend
Free practice sessions will be conducted on specific dates during weeks preceding the race.

The qualifying session lasts 30 minutes in a unique or multiple turn and decides the grid order for the first race which has a duration of 28 minutes + 1 lap.

The second race lasts 28 minutes + 1 lap and the grid is decided by the qualifying session with top 8 being reversed, so the driver who started 8th on 1st race will start from pole position and the pole sitter will start from 8th place.

Scoring system
Pole for first and third race: 1 point (not for National Trophy drivers)

Fastest lap: 1 point in each race (not for National Trophy drivers)

Results

See also
Formula Renault
Abarth
Formula Pilota China
Panam GP Series

References

External links
 
paddock.it Formula Azzurra

 
Formula racing series
Formula racing
Recurring sporting events established in 2010
Recurring sporting events disestablished in 2013